The large moth subfamily Lymantriinae contains the following genera beginning with V:

References 

Lymantriinae
Lymantriid genera V